A chop block may refer to:
 Chop block (gridiron football), a play in which one or more players of the same team are in contact with an opposing team's player, one of whom is blocking at or below the knees.
 Chop block (professional wrestling attack), a professional wrestling attack which similarly targets an opponent's knee.

See also
 Chopping block
 Chopping Block
 The Chopping Block